Bohuslav Matěj Černohorský (Christened 16 February 1684, Nymburk, Bohemia – 1 July 1742, Graz, Austria) was a Czech composer, organist and teacher of the baroque era. He wrote among other works motets, other choral works (a fugue Laudetur Jesus Christus is cited by the Baroque Music Library as an excellent example of its kind) and organ solo works.

Life
He was a son of a Nymburk cantor named Samuel Černohorský. From 1700 to 1702 he studied philosophy at the Prague university. In 1704 Černohorský became a member of the Conventual Franciscan; later, in 1708 he was ordained as a priest. Nevertheless, in 1710 Černohorský was expelled from Czech lands for ten years, and he left for Assisi, Italy. From 1710 to 1715 he worked as an organist in the Basilica of San Francesco d'Assisi, and probably studied  counterpoint with Giuseppe Tartini. He was called "Padre Boemo" in Italy. After the expiration of his punishment, he came back to Prague, where he devoted himself to teaching. Among the important pupils of the "Černohorský school" are Josef Seger, František Tůma and others. In 1731 he came to Italy again, and worked as an organist in Padua. Černohorský died in Graz in 1742. He is an ancestor of Canadian composer Peter Černohorský.

According to the biography at Arta.cz below, he officiated at the wedding of his colleague Šimon Brixi, father of František Xaver Brixi.

Style
Černohorský was an important representative of the late baroque style. He composed fugues and toccatas for organ, as well as vocal works. He deeply influenced the musical evolution in Czech as a composer, as well as a teacher.

Selected works
Vesperae Minus Solemnes (1702–1710) for choir, two violins and organ
Regina Coeli (1712), antifone for double choir
Laudetur Jesus Christus (1729) for soprano, alt, tenor, bass, strings and organ
Precatus est Moyses 
Quare Domine Irasceris both for soprano, alt, tenor, bass, two violins, viola, three trumpets and organ

References

External links

[ Brief biography] at Allmusic.com 
  Works for organ.

1684 births
1742 deaths
18th-century Bohemian musicians
18th-century classical composers
18th-century keyboardists
18th-century male musicians
18th-century musicians
Czech Baroque composers
Czech classical musicians
Czech classical organists
Czech expatriates in Italy
Czech male classical composers
Czech Roman Catholic priests
Franciscans
Male classical organists
People from Nymburk